is a Japanese rugby union footballer. He plays as a scrum-half.

He plays for the Toshiba Brave Lupus in Japan's Top League.

He had 25 caps for Japan, from 2007 to 2011, scoring 2 tries, 10 points on aggregate. He was called for the 2007 Rugby World Cup, playing in three games but without scoring. He played again for his country at the 2011 Rugby World Cup in New Zealand, in a single game, once again remaining scoreless.

External links
 
 

1982 births
Japanese rugby union players
Living people
Japan international rugby union players
Toshiba Brave Lupus Tokyo players
Sportspeople from Kyoto
Rugby union scrum-halves